The Gillette City Hall (1936), at 400 S. Gillette Ave. in Gillette, Wyoming, United States, was built in 1936.  It was listed on the National Register of Historic Places in 2019.

It was built during the Great Depression.

A plaque on the brick building lists Mayor Roy Montgomery, four City Council members, and credits Robert L. Streeter, engineer.

References

National Register of Historic Places in Campbell County, Wyoming
Neoclassical architecture in Wyoming
Buildings and structures completed in 1935
Gillette, Wyoming